Shepherd is a surname, cognate of the English word "Shepherd". Several common spelling variations exist, including Shepperd, Shephard, Shepard, and Sheppard.

Shepherd

Surname

 Adaline Shepherd, American composer
 Alan Shepherd, British motorcycle Grand Prix road racer
 Amba Shepherd, Australian singer
 Ann Shepherd, American actress born Shaindel Kalish
 Briana Shepherd, Western Australian journalist, reporter and news presenter, former New York City Ballet dancer
 Chandler Shepherd, American professional baseball player (Boston Red Sox)
 Cybill Shepherd, American actress
 Darrius Shepherd (born 1995), American football player
 David Shepherd (disambiguation)
 Dolly Shepherd, hot-air balloon trapeze artist
 Frances Alice Shepherd, Canadian academic
 Freddy Shepherd, businessman and chairman of Newcastle United
 George Shepherd (artist), English draughtsman and watercolourist
 George Shepherd, 1st Baron Shepherd, British Labour politician
 J. Marshall Shepherd, American meteorologist
 Jack Shepherd (disambiguation), multiple people
 JaCorey Shepherd, American football player
 Jean Shepherd, American radio personality and writer
 Jenny Shepherd, New Zealand field hockey player
 Joel Shepherd, Australian science fiction author
 John Shepherd (disambiguation), several people
 Jonathan Shepherd, Welsh surgeon
 Keith Shepherd, major league baseball player
 Kenny Wayne Shepherd (born Kenny Wayne Brobst, Jr), an American blues guitarist, singer and songwriter
 Kirk Shepherd, English darts player
 Leo Shepherd, US jazz trumpeter
 Liam 'Lewy' Shepherd, SEO Consultant
 Malcolm Shepherd, 2nd Baron Shepherd, British Labour politician
 Mark Shepherd (businessman), chairman and CEO of Texas Instruments
 Mark Shepherd (novelist), author of several fantasy novels
 Mark Allen Shepherd (born 1961), actor
 Mary Shepherd, British philosopher
 Mary Patricia Shepherd (1933 –  2003), British thoracic surgeon 
 Michael Shepherd (psychiatrist), British psychiatrist and author
 Morgan Shepherd, NASCAR driver
 Nathan Shepherd (American football) (born 1993), Canadian-American football player
 Robert Shepherd (1937–2008), law professor
 Robert Shepherd (footballer) (born 1956), Australian rules footballer
 Roy Shepherd (born 1931), British ice hockey player
 Roy Shepherd (pianist) (1907–1986), Australian pianist and teacher
 Sanger Shepherd, British inventor of an early colour photography process
 Sherri Shepherd (born 1967), media personality, actress and comedian
 Thomas D. Shepherd (1889–1954), American college football player and coach
 Thomas H. Shepherd (1792–1864), British architectural artist
 William Robert Shepherd (1871–1934), American cartographer and historian

Given name

 Shepherd Brooks, member of a prominent Medford family who developed the 19th-century Shepherd Brooks Estate
 Shepherd Clark, American competitive figure skater
 Shepherd Dawson (1880–1935), British psychologist
 Shepherd Heyward (died 1859), free black man who was killed during the raid on Harpers Ferry
 Shepherd Leffler (1811–1879), U.S. Representative from Iowa
 Shepherd Mead (1914–1994), born Edward Mead, American writer
 Shepherd Murape, Zimbabwean former football player and manager
 Shepherd Skanes, American football coach

Fictional Shepherds

 Derrial Book (a.k.a. Shepherd Book), character in the television series, Firefly
 Alex Shepherd, character from the Silent Hill series
 Derek Shepherd, character on the ABC television series Grey's Anatomy and Private Practice
 Amelia Shepherd, character on the ABC television series Private Practice and Grey's Anatomy
 General Shepherd, a fictional character and the main antagonist from video game Call of Duty: Modern Warfare 2
 Jason Shepherd, the main protagonist of the film Big Fat Liar
  Tommy Shepherd, a superhero from Marvel Comics

Shepperd

Surname

Augustine Henry Shepperd, Congressional Representative from North Carolina
Robin Shepperd, British television director

Given name
Shepperd Strudwick, American actor of film, television and stage
William Shepperd Ashe, Democratic U.S. Congressman from North Carolina between 1849 and 1855

Other uses

 Shepperd's Dell, a small canyon in the Columbia River Gorge in Oregon

Shephard

Surname

Ben Shephard, English television presenter
Ben Shephard (English historian)
Esther Shephard, American writer
Gary Shephard, former Welsh professional footballer
Geoffrey Colin Shephard, Mathematician
Gillian Shephard, Baroness Shephard of Northwold
Gordon Strachey Shephard Brigadier-General killed in action in 1918
Hale Horatio Shephard (1842–1921), British judge in India
Isaac F. Shephard, American Civil War officer
Michelle Shephard, Canadian journalist
Neil Shephard, British economist
Richard Shephard (1949–2021), British choral music composer
Ronald Shephard, American economist
Rupert Shephard, English artist
Sidney Shephard, British politician

Other uses
Shephard's lemma
Shephard's problem
Chevalley–Shephard–Todd theorem

Fictional Shephards
Adrian Shephard, character in the computer game Half-Life: Opposing Force
Christian Shephard, character on the television series Lost, father of Jack Shephard
Jack Shephard, character on the television series Lost

Sheppard

Surname

 Alison Sheppard (born 1972), Scottish Olympic swimmer
 Allen Sheppard, Baron Sheppard of Didgemere (born 1932), British industrialist
 Andy Sheppard (born 1957), British jazz saxophonist and composer
 Ashley Sheppard (born 1969), American football player
 Austin Oke Sheppard (1844-1927), British colony of Newfoundland, 3rd generation lighthouse keeper, posts at Dodding Head, Fort Amherst and Cape Spear, grandfather of Robert Carl Sheppard
 Bob Sheppard (1910–2010), American sports announcer
 Bob Sheppard (musician) (born 1952), American jazz saxophonist
 Barbara Bohannan-Sheppard (born 1950), American politician
 Charles Bradford Sheppard, American radio and electrical engineer
 Chris Sheppard (born 1981), Australian rugby player
 Chris Sheppard (DJ), Jamaican-Canadian disc jockey and musician
 Colin Sheppard, British engineering professor
 Curtis Sheppard (born ), American boxer
 David Sheppard
 Dave Sheppard (1931–2000), American weightlifter and Olympic medalist
 David Sheppard (1929–2005), English cricketer and bishop
 David Sheppard (broadcaster) (born 1981), British radio presenter
 Dick Sheppard (priest) (1880–1937), English clergyman and pacifist
 Dick Sheppard (footballer) (1945–1998), English football goalkeeper
 Eleanor P. Sheppard (1907–1991), American politician
 Elizabeth Sheppard (1830–1862), British novelist
 Emma Sheppard (1813-1871), English writer and workhouse reformer
 Fleetwood Sheppard (1634–1698), British poet
Francis M. Sheppard (1868-1948) American politician
 Gerrard Sheppard (born 1990), American football player
 Harriet Sheppard (born circa 1783), Canadian botanist
 Howard Sheppard (1933–2013), Canadian politician
 Jack Sheppard (1702–1724), English criminal
 Jack Sheppard (cave diver) (1909–2001), British cave diver
 Jack Sheppard (cricketer) (born 1992), English cricketer
 James Sheppard (born 1988), Canadian ice hockey player
 Jason Sheppard (born 1978), American politician
 Jeff Sheppard (born 1974), American professional and collegiate basketball player
 John Sheppard (disambiguation), several people
 Joseph Sheppard (born 1958), American actor
 Kate Sheppard (1848–1934), New Zealand suffragette and civil rights campaigner
 Kenny Wayne Shepherd (born 1977), American guitarist, singer, and songwriter
 Kiki Shepard (born 1951), American television host
 Lianne Sheppard, American statistician
Lil Gnar, (born as Caleb Sheppard 1996), American designer, rapper, and skateboarder
 Lito Sheppard (born 1981), American football cornerback
 Mark Sheppard (born 1964), English actor
 Mel Sheppard (1883–1942), American athlete
 Mike Sheppard (baseball) (born 1936), American college baseball coach
 Mike Sheppard (American football) (born 1951), American football player and coach
 Morris Sheppard (1875–1941), American Congressman and Senator
 Moses Sheppard (1771–1857), American businessman and Quaker
 Mubin Sheppard (1905–1994), Irish-born historian of Malaysian culture
 Peter Sheppard Skærved (born 1966), British violinist
 Philip Sheppard (1921–1976), British geneticist
 R. Sheppard Marble and Stone Works of Toronto, Ontario was a monumental masonry firm active in nineteenth-century Ontario
 Ray Sheppard (born 1966), Canadian ice hockey player
 Revett Sheppard (1778-1830), British naturalist
 Richard Sheppard (architect) (1910–1982), English architect
 Rob Sheppard, American college baseball coach
Robert Carl Sheppard, MBE (1897-954), from the British colony of Newfoundland, WW1 veteran of the Battle of the Somme (Beaumont-Hamel, France), lighthouse keeper at Fort Amherst, NL and master mariner of two ships chartered for the British Antarctic expedition, Operation Tabarin.
 Ronald G. Sheppard (born 1939), American politician
 Sam Sheppard (1923–1970), American neurosurgeon
 Samara Sheppard (born 1990), New Zealand mountain biker
 Scott S. Sheppard (born 1976), American astronomer
 Sheppard family (clothiers), family in Frome, Somerset since 1614
 Sherri D. Sheppard (born 1956), American professor of mechanical engineering
 Simon Sheppard (writer), American writer
 Simon Sheppard (activist) (born 1957), British far-right activist
 Simon Sheppard (footballer) (born 1973), English former goalkeeper
 Stephen Lea Sheppard (born 1983), Canadian television and film actor
 Thomas Sheppard (disambiguation), several people
 T. G. Sheppard (born 1944), American country music singer
 William Sheppard (disambiguation), several people

Given name
 Sheppard Frere (1916–2015), British historian and archaeologist
 Sheppard Homans Jr. (1871–1952), All-American football player and insurance executive
 Sheppard J. Shreaves (1885–1968), dockmaster, shipwright and diver
 Sheppard Solomon, American songwriter

Fictional Sheppards
 John Sheppard (Stargate), lieutenant colonel in the United States Air Force played by Joe Flanigan in the television series Stargate Atlantis
 James Sheppard, the narrator in The Murder of Roger Ackroyd by Agatha Christie
 Bruno Sheppard, an antagonist in M.A.S.K. (TV series)
 Principal Sheppard, a fictional character in Degrassi: The Next Generation

Shepard

Surname

Alan Shepard, American astronaut
Alexandra Shepard, Historian
Anna O. Shepard, American archaeologist
Bert Shepard, American WWII pilot & baseball player
Cecelia Shepard, victim of the Zodiac Killer
David Shepard (film preservationist)
David H. Shepard, American inventor
Dax Shepard, American actor, comedian, writer, and director
Elliott Fitch Shepard, American lawyer, banker, and newspaper editor
E. H. Shepard, British artist and illustrator
Edward M. Shepard, American lawyer and political reformer 
Irene Shepard, American educator and politician
Jean Shepard (1933–2016), American honky tonk singer and songwriter
Jessica Shepard (born 1996), American basketball player
 Joseph Shepard I (1765-1837), American born Canadian farmer and milita officer and namesake for Sheppard Avenue
Lorenzo B. Shepard, American lawyer and politician
Louis C. Shepard, American Civil War Medal of Honor recipient
Lucius Shepard, American science fiction and fantasy writer
Marshall L. Shepard, American politician
Mary Shepard, British illustrator
Matt Shepard (sportscaster), Detroit, Michigan TV sports commentator
Matthew Shepard, American victim of a hate crime
Norman Shepard, American college sports coach
Roger Shepard, American cognitive scientist
Sam Shepard (1943-2017), American playwright and actor
Sara Shepard, American author
Thomas Shepard (minister), Puritan minister in colonial America
Thomas Z. Shepard, American recording producer, composer, and conductor
Vonda Shepard, American singer
William Shepard, former U.S. Representative from Massachusetts

Given name
Shepard Broad, American banker and lawyer
Shepard Cary, U.S. Representative from Maine
Shepard Fairey, American artist
Shepard Smith, American TV anchor

Fictional Shepards
 Commander Shepard, main character of the Mass Effect video games.
 Tim Shepard, character from S.E. Hinton's novel The Outsiders. He has siblings Curly Shepard and Angela Shepard, featuring in Hinton's novel That Was Then, This Is Now
Shepard (comics), character in the Marvel Comics Universe
 Director Jenny Shepard, character on the TV series NCIS

See also
 General Shepherd (disambiguation)
 Shepherd (disambiguation)
 Shepard (disambiguation)
 Sheppard (disambiguation)
 Schappert
 Schaefer

English-language surnames
Given names
Occupational surnames
English-language occupational surnames